is an actor and celebrity television personality or gaijin tarento, in Japan. He first learned Japanese while working as a Mormon missionary in Japan when he was 19 years old. He is known as one of "the two Kents" (along with Kent Gilbert). Derricott was the first thing to come to the mind of Japanese when asked about Utah for a 2002 study for the 2002 Winter Olympics in Salt Lake City, Utah.

While he has been offered celebrity jobs in the United States (such as the opportunity to be the replacement for Richard Dawson on Family Feud), he is not interested in becoming a celebrity outside Japan. After returning from Japan in the 1990s, Derricott started his own television production company. Derricott is a consultant for businesses working in or expanding to Japan and he now lives in Bountiful, Utah. He still makes occasional appearances on Japanese television.

Books
Derricott has written several books published in Japan, including:
 (Zenkoku Asahi Hōsō, November 1988)
 (KTC Chūō Shuppan, July 1999)
 (Hakusensha, October 2005)
 (Takeshobo, June 1991)

References

External links
Official site at Sankei Pro
Derricott, Kent in libraries (WorldCat catalog)

1955 births
Canadian male television actors
Canadian expatriates in Japan
Canadian expatriates in the United States
Canadian Latter Day Saints
Canadian Mormon missionaries
Expatriate television personalities in Japan
Living people
Mormon missionaries in Japan
People from Lethbridge
20th-century Mormon missionaries
Male actors from Alberta